The 1966 Cork Junior Football Championship was the 68th staging of the Cork Junior A Football Championship since its establishment by Cork County Board in 1895. The championship ran from 9 October to 11 December 1966.

The final, which went to a replay, was played on 11 December 1966 at the Athletic Grounds in Cork, between Dohenys and Grange, in what was their first ever meeting in the final. Dohenys won the match by 3-08 to 1-06 to claim their second championship title overall and a first title in 31 years.

Qualification

Results

Quarter-finals

Semi-finals

Final

References

1966 in Irish sport
Cork Junior Football Championship